Namupala Reonard (born 28 March 1982) is a Namibian long distance runner. He competed in the men's marathon at the 2017 World Championships in Athletics.

References

External links

1982 births
Living people
Namibian male long-distance runners
Namibian male marathon runners
World Athletics Championships athletes for Namibia
Athletes (track and field) at the 2018 Commonwealth Games
Commonwealth Games competitors for Namibia
Place of birth missing (living people)